Eugéne Fomumbod (born February 22, 1985 in Buea, Cameroon) is a Cameroonian football midfielders player who currently plays for Veszprém FC.

References
HLSZ 
Nemzeti Sport 
Profile 

1985 births
Living people
People from Buea
Cameroonian footballers
Association football midfielders
Aris Thessaloniki F.C. players
BFC Siófok players
Győri ETO FC players
Veszprém LC footballers
Cameroonian expatriate footballers
Expatriate footballers in Greece
Expatriate footballers in Hungary
Cameroonian expatriate sportspeople in Greece
Cameroonian expatriate sportspeople in Hungary